This Cake Is for the Party is a collection of short stories by Canadian author Sarah Selecky published by Thomas Allen & Son Limited. It was shortlisted for the 2010 Scotiabank Giller Prize.

Short stories
 "Throwing Cotton” - A woman reuniting with her friends from university suspects her husband is cheating on her. 
 "Watching Atlas” - A man and his partner fight over her best friend who is an alcoholic.  
 "How Healthy Are You?” - A woman has a chance meeting with another woman she met during a clinical drug trial in Ottawa during her student days. 
 "Go-Manchura” - A woman tries to involve her friends in a pyramid scheme.
 "Standing up for Janey” - After her own relationship dissolves, a woman holds an engagement party for her best friend. 
 "Where Are You Coming From, Sweetheart?” - A young girl from Sudbury living under the strict rule of her father visits her aunt and cousin in Toronto.  
 “Prognosis” - A woman confesses a set of religious miracles to her mother-in-law. 
 "Paul Farenbacher's Yard Sale” - A woman helps her neighbours sell of the possessions of the now deceased patriarch of the family.  
 "This is How We Grow as Humans” - Two former friends confront each other over lunch after one of them has an affair with the other’s boyfriend. 
 "One Thousand Wax Buddhas” - A candlemaker struggles with his wife’s mental illness.

Awards and nominations

"Throwing Cotton" was nominated for the Journey Prize in 2006.

This Cake Is for the Party was shortlisted for the 2010 Scotiabank Giller Prize, but lost to The Sentimentalists.

References

Canadian short story collections
2010 short story collections
Thomas Allen Publishers books